The Clown is a 1931 short animated film by Universal Pictures, and one of many in the Oswald the Lucky Rabbit series.

Plot
Oswald, as the title implies, is a circus clown who performs acts in the big top along with his partner the live female stuffed doll, aka Kitty. After doing some acts involving horses, Kitty is being asked by the ringmaster to sign some kind of contract. Oswald is suspicious of the ringmaster's plans, and tries to intervene, only to be whipped away by the ringmaster.

While Oswald is performing his next act involving a dog and an elephant, the ringmaster tries again to get Kitty to sign. They are, however, interrupted once more by Oswald who finishes on time.

Next, it is time for Oswald and the ringmaster to make their appearance. Oswald enters a cannon, and the latter becomes the one to fire it. Kitty senses the ringmaster is up to something, and therefore rushes to the scene. When Oswald is fired from the cannon, Kitty grabs onto his legs. As they are sent airborne, they spin around, causing them to return like a boomerang and knock down the ringmaster. Oswald immediately performs again in the limelight, this time involving an invisible car created by pantomime.

Kitty returns to perform. Here, she suspends on the end of a rope which is pulled upward. The scheming ringmaster cuts the rope a little where it would break momentarily. Oswald is aware of this as the rabbit reenters the cannon. When Kitty plunges, Oswald launches out and catches her mid-air. The ringmaster tries to create more trouble for them by releasing a vicious gorilla. But instead of chasing the two performers, the gorilla pursues the ringmaster out of the big top.

References

External links
The Clown at the Big Cartoon Database

1931 films
1931 animated films
1930s American animated films
1930s animated short films
American black-and-white films
Films directed by Walter Lantz
Oswald the Lucky Rabbit cartoons
Universal Pictures animated short films
Walter Lantz Productions shorts
Comedy films about clowns
Animated films about animals
Films about bears